Fulcrifera tricentra is a moth of the family Tortricidae first described by Edward Meyrick in 1907. It is found in India, Sri Lanka, Indonesia (Java) and probably also China. It has also been reported from South Africa, but this seems doubtful.

The wingspan is 10–13 mm.

The larvae feed on Crotalaria juncea, Phaseolus mungo, Dolichos lablab, Dolichos biflorus and Tephrosia purpurea. The larvae bore into the shoots of young Crotolaria juncea plants, causing stem galls. In later stages of the plant, the attack takes place at the axils of the leaves.

References

External links
Eurasian Tortricidae

Grapholitini
Moths described in 1907